Garage is a Czech rock band from Prague, formed in 1979 by Ivo Pospíšil under the name Garáž. In the 1980s, the band included guitarist Milan Hlavsa, from the Plastic People of the Universe. After the Velvet Revolution in 1989, Garage played concerts abroad, including in New York City, Switzerland, Germany, Belgium, and France. In 1994, the group released the album Garage, produced by Ivan Král.

History
Formed in 1979 by Ivo Pospíšil of DG 307, the band was initially called Garáž. In 1982, they were joined by singer Tony Ducháček, who became their primary songwriter. In the years 1983–84, the group's first demo tapes, Garáž... byla a je and
Garáž? Na tu nemáš! emerged, and Milan Hlavsa, founder of the Plastic People of the Universe, joined up. Under the Communist regime during the 1980s, Garáž was rarely allowed to play officially, and they were mainly relegated to the underground scene. As they weren't allowed to release official albums at the time, their recordings circulated as samizdat on cassettes.

After the Velvet Revolution of 1989, all restrictions on the group were lifted. During the next few years, Garáž experienced the peak of their popularity. They performed across Czechoslovakia as well as overseas, including at clubs in New York City, Switzerland, and Germany and at festivals in Belgium and France. At that time, the band included guitarist Joe Karafiát, who lived in Canada for ten years and returned to Czechoslovakia after the revolution.

In 1993, following member disagreements, Garáž separated from founder and manager, Ivo Pospíšil, who continued performing under the band's original name. The remaining musicians adopted the English version of their old name and continued as Garage a Tony Ducháček.

In 1994, they released the album Garage, produced by Ivan Král.

Band members

Current
 Tony Ducháček – vocals
 Jan Macháček – guitar
 David Fikrle – bass
 Honza Pokorný
 René Starhon

Past
 Ivo Pospíšil – bass
 Milan Hlavsa – bass
 Karel Habal
 Tomáš Volák
 Ian Losz
 Ivan Cifrinec
 Zdeněk Smetana
 Josef Vondrášek
 Antonín Pěnička – drums
 Jaroslav Jeřábek – saxophone
 Joe Karafiát – guitar
 Jaroslav Kvasnička – bass
 Robert Jína – guitar
 Vladimír Zatloukal – guitar

Discography
 Garáž... byla a je (1984)
 Garáž? Na tu nemáš! (1988)
 The Best of Garáž (1990)
 Vykopávky Praha (1990)
 Garáž – Demo (1991)
 Garáž – Praha (1991)
 Garáž No. 1-1981 (1993)
 No Parking (1993)
 Garage (1994)
 Apogeum (1996)
 Nepohádka (2000)
 BLACK! (2009)
 Live 2011 (2012)

References

External links

 

Czech rock music groups
Musical groups established in 1979
1979 establishments in Czechoslovakia
Czech underground music groups